Luna Peak is one of the Borealis Peaks in the Coast Mountains of British Columbia, Canada.  The Borealis Peaks are located south of the Bella Coola River valley, west of the upper Atnarko River and north of the Monarch Mountain-Ha-Iltzuk Icefield massif. The peak was named for Luna, goddess of the Moon in Roman mythology.


References

Two-thousanders of British Columbia
Central Coast of British Columbia
Pacific Ranges
Range 3 Coast Land District